Yogyakarta Independent School (YIS), also known as Yogyakarta International School, is a primary and secondary school in Yogyakarta, Indonesia. Founded in 1989, the school features international curriculums delivered by a team of international and national teachers. The YIS is accredited to teach the International Baccalaureate (IB) curriculum, and is an IB World School.  The school population is around 100 students. The school is affiliated with the East Asia Regional Council of Overseas Schools (EARCOS).

Notes

External links

Official website

Sleman Regency
Education in the Special Region of Yogyakarta
International schools in Indonesia
Educational institutions established in 1989
1989 establishments in Indonesia